Jarret Davis (born June 17, 1989) is a Belizean professional footballer currently playing for Verdes FC as a striker.

He was a member of the Belize squad for the 2014 Copa Centroamericana, playing two games against Honduras and El Salvador.

International career

International goals
Scores and results list Belize's goal tally first.

References

External links
Honduras vs Belize 
El Salvador vs Belize 

1989 births
Living people
Belize international footballers
Belizean footballers
Premier League of Belize players
2014 Copa Centroamericana players
2017 Copa Centroamericana players

Association football forwards
FC Belize players
Verdes FC players